Jennell Jaquays (born Paul Jaquays, October 14, 1956) is an American game designer, video game artist, and illustrator of tabletop role-playing games (RPGs). Her notable works include the Dungeons & Dragons modules Dark Tower and Caverns of Thracia for Judges Guild; the development and design of conversions on games such as Pac-Man and Donkey Kong for Coleco's home arcade video game system; and more recent design work, including the Age of Empires series, Quake 2, and Quake III Arena. Some of her best known works as a fantasy artist are the cover illustration for TSR's Dragon Mountain adventure.

Early life and education
Jennell Jaquays was born on October 14, 1956 in Michigan and grew up in Michigan and Indiana. Jaquays graduated from Michigan's Jackson County Western High School in 1974 and Spring Arbor College in 1978 with a Bachelor of Arts in Fine Art.

Career

The Dungeoneer and fantasy roleplaying 
While still at college, Jaquays became interested in science-fiction and fantasy gaming and the nascent role-playing game industry through the pages of The Space Gamer. Jaquays discovered Dungeons & Dragons in 1975 and formed the Fantastic Dungeoning Society with several friends at college including Mark Hendricks. Together they decided to create a fanzine, which would provide adventures for other Game Masters. TSR's Tim Kask gave Jaquays a casual license to publish this fanzine, The Dungeoneer, an amateur publication but one of the earliest RPG periodicals.

The first issue was published in the same month as Dragon #1 (June 1976). The first issue was mainly drawn and written by Jaquays, with some contributions from other FDS members. In all, FDS produced six issues of The Dungeoneer from 1976-1978. Marketed as a "dungeonmaster's publication," the magazine was noteworthy for its pioneering approach to pre-factored adventures, "F'Chelrak's Tomb" was published in June 1976, the same month as Wee Warriors' Palace of the Vampire Queen. The publication has been an inspiration for many similarly-themed magazines in the United States and elsewhere.

In addition to these "honest efforts at quality contents to interest readers," Jaquays began submitting artwork to TSR's in-house gaming magazine, The Dragon, in 1976. Jaquays' work appeared in the premiere issue of The Dragon, and later contributions included the cover of issue #21.

Judges Guild, later independent role-playing projects, and TSR 
By late 1977, Jaquays was approaching graduation and needed to spend more time in the art studio, so FDS sold The Dungeoneer to Chuck Anshell of Anshell Miniatures. Anshell soon came to work at Judges Guild, and Jaquays ended up there too by October 1978, working with them for a year as an illustrator and adventure designer. By late 1978 Judges Guild was a prolific provider of material and officially licensed products for TSR's Dungeons & Dragons (D&D) line. Anshell retained a level of editorial control over The Dungeoneer, one of Judges Guild's two gaming periodicals. Jaquays worked on two stand-alone D&D modules for Dungeons & Dragons, Dark Tower and Caverns of Thracia, which were completed before she left the company in October 1979. She provided a variety of content on a freelance basis thereafter, particularly to The Dungeoneer. Jaquays and Rudy Kraft authored Adventures Beyond the Pass for Judges Guild, which they never published; instead Greg Stafford liked it enough that Chaosium published it as Griffin Mountain (1981). The MicroGame Chitin: I (1978) by Metagaming Concepts featured art by Jaquays. Jaquays, Denis Loubet, and Jeff Dee produced Cardboard Heroes in the early 1980s for Steve Jackson Games.

Jaquays expanded her career to include video game design in the early 1980s, but continued to work as a freelancer for various table-top game publishers including TSR, Chaosium, West End Games, Flying Buffalo, and Iron Crown Enterprises. She produced illustrations for Game Designers' Workshop (GDW), most notably creating all the starship illustrations in Traveller Supplement 9: Fighting Ships. A number of these became the basis for starship models from Ad Astra Games and the deckplans found in Mongoose Traveller Supplement 3 - Fighting Ships.

From 1986 to 1993, she did freelance work while running a design studio. Jaquays prepared a series of character-creation supplements called Central Casting (1988-1991) for Flying Buffalo, which were published by Task Force Games. Jaquays also prepared three more City Books (1990-1994) out of house for Flying Buffalo. From 1993 to 1997, she returned to full-time employment in the table-top gaming industry as an illustrator for TSR, including a six-month period as Director of Graphics. She left TSR just before their takeover by Wizards of the Coast. During this time, she played an active role in the creation of the Dragon Dice game, both as cover artist and icon designer.

Freelance artwork 
In addition to many gaming artwork contributions (including artwork spread over two decades for TSR's first-line periodicals, Dragon and Dungeon) she worked as an illustrator and cartoonist for the Jackson Citizen Patriot in 1980. During the late 1980s, Jaquays was a regular interior artist for Amazing Stories, and contributed one cover for that publication.

Video game industry 
Michael A. Stackpole worked for Coleco from 1980-1981 and brought friend and fellow RPG designer Jaquays over to Coleco. After leaving Judges Guild, Jaquays worked for Coleco, first in a freelance capacity from 1980, then as a full-time employee from 1981 to 1985. She developed and designed arcade conversions of many well-known titles such as Pac-Man and Donkey Kong for their home arcade video game system. Jaquays eventually became director of game design. Jaquays assembled one of the first art and design studios for video game development at Coleco to make ColecoVision games. During a freelance design studio period in the late 1980s and early 1990s, she continued to be involved in the video game industry, with concept and design work for Epyx, Interplay Entertainment, and Electronic Arts.

From March 1997, Jaquays was employed as level designer for id Software, best known for their Quake series of video games. She then moved to the Dallas-based Ensemble Studios, which had "become a haven for ex-id Software developers." She worked there from early 2002, with former tabletop and computer gaming contemporary Sandy Petersen, until the company's closure in January 2009.  Petersen had previously hired Jaquays to be a content designer at id Software.  In 2003 Jaquays co-founded The Guildhall at SMU, a video game education program, located at the Plano campus of Southern Methodist University (SMU) in Dallas. She helped create much of the program's original curriculum. Jaquays continues as an advisor to The Guildhall program. As of October 2009, Jaquays was employed as a senior-level designer with the North American division of Iceland's CCP Games.

Jennell currently divides her creative energy between projects for design studio Dragongirl Studios, her Fifth Wall brand of game adventures and miniatures, and serving as the creative director for Olde Sküül, Inc., a digital game developer and publisher based in Seattle, Washington which she founded with three other veteran female developers in 2012.

Awards and honors 
Jaquays' Dark Tower was nominated for the 1979 H.G. Wells award for Best Roleplaying Adventure. In November 2004, as part of the 30th anniversary celebration for Dungeons & Dragons, Dungeon magazine produced a list of the "thirty greatest D&D Adventures of All Time." Dark Tower was the only entry on the list not published by TSR. Jaquays was co-author and illustrator for Chaosium's Griffin Mountain RuneQuest scenario. Set in Glorantha, this highly praised scenario was nominated for the 1981 H.G. Wells award. The reworked version, Griffin Island, was nominated for the same award in 1986. Coleco's Wargames, for which Jaquays was co-designer of gameplay, won the 1984 Summer C.E.S. original software award. As a level designer for TSR's Castle Greyhawk module, Jaquays shared the 1989 Origins Gamer's Choice Award for Best Role-Playing Adventure.

Jaquays has been honored as one of the Top 50 Transgender Americans You Should Know by LGBTQ Nation, and a Trans 100 2015 Honoree.

Jennell Jaquays' contributions to the early video game industry are recognized on a collectable trading Card #2036. Jaquays is noted here as one of the women filmed for the documentary film "No Princess in the Castle." In 2017, she was honored as a Hall of Fame Inductee for the Academy of Adventure Gaming Arts & Design, as well as an Origins 2017 Guest of Honor.

Activism 
As creative director for the Transgender Human Rights Institute in Seattle, Jennell Jaquays was involved in the petition to create "Leelah's Law," outlawing conversion therapy of LGBT youth. In response to the petition, in April 2015 President Barack Obama called for the banning of conversion therapy for minors.

Personal life
Jaquays has two children from her first marriage. Jaquays announced in December 2011 that she identifies as a lesbian and trans woman. She resides in Seattle, Washington, with her wife Rebecca Heineman.

Works 
Partial bibliography of works in print

 The Dungeoneer (D&D fanzine) (editor 1976–77; contributor 1976–79)
 Dark Tower (AD&D Scenario – Judges Guild:88) (1980; revised 2001, 2007)
 The Caverns of Thracia (D&D Scenario – Judges Guild:102) (1979; revised 2004)
 Legendary Duck Tower and Other Tales (Runequest Scenario – Judges Guild:220) (1980) (with Rudy Kraft)
 The Unknown Gods (D&D Sourcebook – Judges Guild:420) (1980) (co-author)
 Griffin Mountain (Runequest Campaign Setting) (1981; revised and expanded 1986 as Griffin Island) (with Rudy Kraft and Greg Stafford)
 Cults of Terror (Runequest Sourcebook) (1981) (co-author)
 The Enchanted Wood (DragonQuest Module) (1981)
 Talons of Night (D&D Module:M5) (1987)
 The Shattered Statue (AD&D/DragonQuest Module:DQ1) (1987)
 Egg of the Phoenix (AD&D Module:I12) (1987) (with Frank Mentzer)
 Terror in Skytumble Tor (part of AD&D Module: I13) (1987)
 Castle Greyhawk (AD&D Module:WG7) (1988) (credited as one of the co-authors; wrote Level 4)
 The Savage Frontier (AD&D Module:FR5) (1988)
 Central Casting: Heroes of Legend (Generic Sourcebook) (1988)
 Campaign Sourcebook and Catacomb Guide (AD&D 2nd edition sourcebook:DMGR1) (1990)
 Citybook VI – Uptown (1992) (co-author)
 Shadows on the Borderland (Runequest Adventure) (1993) (co-author)
 Country Sites (1995) (cover artist)

Partial list of video game credits

See also 
 List of video game industry people

References

External links 

Jennell Jaquays at MobyGames

1956 births
American game designers
American speculative fiction artists
American video game designers
Chaosium game designers
Dungeons & Dragons game designers
Fantasy artists
Game artists
Id Software people
LGBT people from Michigan
LGBT people from Washington (state)
Living people
Quake (series)
Role-playing game artists
Science fiction artists
Transgender artists
Transgender women
Video game artists
Women video game designers